Regional League South Division is the 3rd Level League in Thailand.  It was formed in 2009 along with other four other regional leagues, all playing at the same level.  The winner of each regional league enter the Regional League Championships to determine the three teams that will receive promotion to the Thai Division 1 League

League History 

Formed in 2009, initially 9 clubs applied to be part of the new setup; Krabi, Nakhon Si Thammarat, Narathiwat, Pattani, Phattalung, Phuket, Satun, Yala and Tartauo.  Come decision day, Tartauo either failed to apply on time, or were not accepted into the new setup.

Narathiwat and Satun were the only two teams with previous experience in the Thai football league system.

Narathiwat won the first ever championship and took the Regional League championship allocation, winning the division on goal difference from Satun.

The 2010 season saw the arrival of six new teams. Trang, Ranong, Phang Nga, Chumphon and Hat Yai were newly formed sides and Surat Thani were welcomed into the setup after being relegated from the 1st Division.

Prachuap Khiri Khan were also re-located from the Regional League Central-East Division by the RL board but withdrew before the 1st round of games citing insufficient budget and concerns about safety.

The league also said good bye to Narathiwat as they secured promotion to Division 1 through the end of season Regional League playoffs.

Phuket, who struggled in their first season in 2009 won the title, leading the league from start to finish. They had formed close links in the off season with TPL side Muangthong United and brought in a number of loanee players. Trang also used the same principle, teaming up with Thai Port to claim 2nd place in their debut season.

2011 saw the return of Narathiwat after one season away. A disastrous campaign in Division 1 saw them on the brink of financial collapse and they reformed as Nara United for the 2011 season.

The title was won by Krabi with runners up Phattalung also entering the Regional League playoffs. The title went down to the wire just like in 2009 with 5 teams in with a chance of glory with only 3 matchdays remaining.

Krabi and Phattalung also did the league proud with extensive runs in the League Cup and FA Cup. Phattalung making the semi-finals in the TLC.

Timeline

Championship History

Member clubs

External links
 Football Association of Thailand

 
South
Sports leagues established in 2009
2009 establishments in Thailand